Ultratumbita (real name unrevealed) is a Mexican luchador enmascarado, or masked professional wrestler, best known for his work in Consejo Mundial de Lucha Libre's (CMLL), Minis division; working in the Mini division does not necessarily mean that Serrano is a dwarf as several short wrestlers work in the "Mini" division.

Professional wrestling career
In 1992 then-CMLL booker Antonio Peña left CMLL to form his own promotion, Asistencia Asesoría y Administración (AAA); Peña had been the mastermind behind the CMLL Minis division and most of the Minis in CMLL decided to leave with Peña. Ultratumbita and a number of other wrestlers were brought in to replenish the division. Ultratumbita is a miniature version of regular sized wrestler Ultratumba. On September 11, 1993, Ultratumbita defeated Orito to win the CMLL World Mini-Estrella Championship, becoming the third champion. Ultratumbita held the Minis title for 520 days before losing it to Máscarita Mágica on February 13, 1995. In April 1995, Ultratumbita won a Lucha de Apuesta, or "bet match" over Máscarita Mágica as part of their storyline and forced Mágica to unmask. Ultratumbita has not wrestled since late 1995 / early 1996, the most likely reason is that the man behind the Ultratumbita mask was "repackaged" and given a new ring name and mask, but it has never been documented if this truly the case or not.

Championships and accomplishments
Consejo Mundial de Lucha Libre
CMLL World Mini-Estrella Championship (1 time)

Luchas de Apuestas record

References

Year of birth missing (living people)
Living people
Mexican male professional wrestlers
Mini-Estrella wrestlers
Unidentified wrestlers
CMLL World Mini-Estrella Champions